Murder at Scotland Yard is 1953 British crime film directed by Victor M. Gover and starring Tod Slaughter, Patrick Barr and Tucker McGuire. It is a sequel to the 1952 film King of the Underworld and depicts the continuing battle between the master criminal Terence Reilly and Inspector Morley of Scotland Yard. Reilly has escaped from prison and Morley is called in to recapture him. It was made at Bushey Studios. It was Slaughter's last feature film.

Cast
 Tod Slaughter as Terence Reilly 
 Patrick Barr as Inspector Morley 
 Tucker McGuire as Eileen Trotter 
 Dorothy Bramhall as Maria Flame 
 Tom Macaulay as Inspector Grant

References

Bibliography
 Richards, Jeffrey (ed.) The Unknown 1930s: An Alternative History of the British Cinema, 1929-1939. I.B. Tauris, 1998

External links

1953 films
1953 crime films
1950s English-language films
Films set in London
Films directed by Victor M. Gover
British sequel films
British crime films
British black-and-white films
1950s British films